Talun (also Romanized as Ţālūn or Tālūn) is a village in Sulqan Rural District, Kan District, Tehran County, Tehran Province, Iran. At the 2006 census, its population was 196, in 56 families.

References 

Populated places in Tehran County